Western Port Highway (formerly Dandenong–Hastings Road) is a highway in Victoria, Australia, linking the south-eastern fringe of suburban Melbourne to the western coast of Western Port, after which the highway is named, at the Port of Hastings nearly 30 km to the south. It runs from the end of South Gippsland Freeway at Lynbrook, firstly as a dual carriageway and later as an undivided road, to Frankston-Flinders Road at Hastings.

Route
The highway begins at Lyndhurst interchange, where South Gippsland Highway and the alignment of South Gippsland Freeway meet, outside Lynbrook; Western Port Highway is linked directly to the southern end of South Gippsland Freeway by an overpass over South Gippsland Highway. From the interchange, Western Port Highway runs south as a two-lane (each way), dual carriageway, over the Cranbourne railway line, passing through a set of traffic lights at Portlink Drive and Moreton Bay Boulevard, passing through a roundabout at Glasscocks Road, and traffic lights at Thompsons Road. The highway runs onwards further south through a roundabout intersection with Hall Road and traffic light intersections with Ballarto Road and Cranbourne-Frankston Road. The road continues south to North Road as a dual carriageway, before reverting to a dual-lane single carriageway road to Hastings. It continues further south with a roundabout at Baxter-Tooradin Road and finally ending at an intersection with Frankston-Flinders Road, 2 km north of Hastings.

History
Western Port Highway was originally a single carriageway road called Lyndhurst Road in the 1960s, it has been progressively upgraded to a divided highway between South Gippsland Freeway and Cranbourne-Frankston Road during the 1990s, as dramatically-increasing freight traffic volumes to and from Hastings necessitated major upgrades, including eliminating the level crossing with the Cranbourne railway line with an overpass in 2001.

The Country Roads Board (later VicRoads) declared Dandenong-Hastings Road a Main Road in June 1983, from South Gippsland Freeway at Lynbrook to Frankston-Flinders Road in Hastings; this declaration included a section of Tyabb-Tooradin Road between Hastings and Somerville, subsequently subsumed into Dandenong-Hastings Road.

The passing of the Transport Act of 1983 (itself an evolution from the original Highways and Vehicles Act of 1924) provided for the declaration of State Highways, roads two-thirds financed by the State government through VicRoads. Western Port Highway was declared a State Highway in March 1994, from South Gippsland Freeway at Lynbrook to Frankston-Flinders Road at Hastings.

The passing of the Road Management Act 2004 granted the responsibility of overall management and development of Victoria's major arterial roads to VicRoads: in 2004, VicRoads re-declared the road as Western Port Highway (Arterial #6230), beginning at South Gippsland Freeway at Lynbrook and ending at Frankston-Flinders Road in Hastings.

Dandenong-Hastings Road was signed Metropolitan Route 65 in 1989. With Victoria's conversion to the newer alphanumeric system in the late 1990s this was replaced by route A780. After further upgrades, this was converted to route M780 between Lynbrook and Cranbourne South in 2000, with a further extension south between Cranbourne South and Langwarrin after further duplication in 2009.

VicRoads had planned to convert the highway to a six- to eight-lane freeway standard between South Gippsland Freeway and about 1.2 km south of Cranbourne-Frankston Road with full grade-separated interchanges at Glasscocks, Thompsons, Hall and Cranbourne-Frankston Roads, and a half-diamond interchange (north-facing ramps only) at Ballarto Road, with a report released in August 2014, however the State Government abandoned any plans for the upgrade, which was estimated to cost $1 billion, in mid-2016.

Upgrades
2001 – Duplication of 4.4km between South Gippsland Freeway in Lynbrook and Thompsons Road in Lyndhurst, including overpass of Cranbourne railway line, completed January 2001, at a cost of $30.5 million.
2009 – Duplication of 3.9km between Cranbourne-Frankston Road in Cranbourne South and North Road in Langwarrin.

Major intersections

See also

 Highways in Australia
 List of highways in Victoria

References

Highways in Australia
Highways and freeways in Melbourne
Highways in Victoria (Australia)
Transport in the City of Greater Dandenong
Transport in the City of Casey
Transport in the Shire of Mornington Peninsula
Transport in the City of Frankston